Nirbhayadeva was a Thakuri king of Nepal who reigned from .

Reign 
Rudradeva started his reign as a co-ruler of Nirbhayadeva in 1008. The next year, Rudradeva started his joint rule with his grand-nephew Bhojadeva. and from around 1015, Lakshmikamadeva started ruling together with Rudradeva and Bhojadeva. The two monarchs reigned from Lalitpur while the former reigned from Kathmandu. Bhojadeva disappeared from the scene after this period.

References

Citations

Bibliography 

 
 
 

Nepalese monarchs
History of Nepal
11th-century Nepalese people